The Zodiac Killer is a 1971 slasher film directed by Tom Hanson and starring Hal Reed, Bob Jones, Ray Lynch and Tom Pittman. The plot is based on the murders committed by the Zodiac Killer in the San Francisco area, though it takes many liberties with the actual investigation with the film providing a name and back story for the killer.

Plot
The film is a highly fictionalized telling of a month in the life of the Zodiac Killer (played by Hal Reed). The film follows the killer (whose identity as the Zodiac Killer is not revealed until the end of the first act of the film) and a friend, Grover (a drunk, toupée-wearing truck driver who is divorced from his wife and in financial trouble from his divorce) as they meet and go about their normal day. Grover eventually has a nervous breakdown due to the upheaval in his life caused by his divorce, as he is denied the right to visit his daughter when he makes a surprise visit to his ex-wife. Taking his daughter hostage, the police are called and as he tries to escape, Grover sees the day's paper laying on the front steps announcing another murder by the Zodiac Killer. In a fit of madness, he declares himself the Zodiac Killer and lets his daughter go in order to flee. The police shoot him dead as he falls into a nearby pool.

The second act of the film follows the real Zodiac Killer, who the film positions as having a day job as a much put upon postal carrier. The death of his friend causes him to phone the police to announce that the man they killed was not the Zodiac Killer, then goes about a major killing spree culminating in him murdering a pair of lovers in a park. The film also portrays him as a Satanist and one who actively kills those in his personal life who mock him or are mean to him in his normal life or who he hears mock his alter-ego.

The final act of the film attempts to provide a motive for the crime. The Zodiac Killer visits his father in a hospital, where he is kept in a caged room on the top floor. It is implied that the Zodiac's father is mentally ill and has to be restrained 24/7 and refuses any verbal communication with his son. The Zodiac Killer begs for his father to talk to him only to be rebuked. The staff of the facility ask the Zodiac Killer to leave, claiming his presence "upsets" his father. On his way out, the Zodiac Killer takes out his anger on two patients, wounding one and killing another.

The film ends with a voice over monologue as the Zodiac Killer goes about his normal routine. The Zodiac Killer brags about how he will never be caught and taunts the viewers of the film telling them that other monsters like himself lurk out there, able to blend in with normal people to avoid being caught while doing evil.

Cast 

 Hal Reed as Jerry
 Bob Jones as Grover
 Ray Lynch as Sgt. Pittman
 Tom Pittman as Officer Heller
 Mary Darrington as First Murder
 Frank Sanabek as Joe
 Ed Quigley as Tony
 Bertha Dahl as Mrs. Crocker
 Dion Marinkovich as Helen
 Doodles Weaver as Doc
 Gloria Gunn as Marilyn
 Richard Styles as Judd
 Manny Cardoza as Hippy
 Norma Takaki as Lakey
 Donna Register as Donna

Production
In a 2012 interview and again in a 2017 interview, Hanson stated that the production of the film was motivated by an elaborate plot to catch the killer, who, Hanson reasoned, would not be able to resist attending the film's premier.

Release 
The opening night screening took place at San Francisco's RKO Golden Gate Theater on April 7, 1971. Audience members were asked to write their answers to "I think the Zodiac kills because ..." and drop their entries into a large box in order to enter a raffle to win a motorcycle donated by Kawasaki. The unsuspecting filmgoers didn't know that there was a volunteer crouched inside the box comparing their handwriting with samples of the Zodiac's, and that there were goons (including members of the film's cast) waiting in the wings ready to apprehend and interrogate anyone whose penmanship raised a red flag.

Home media 
The Blu-ray for The Zodiac Killer was released on July 25, 2017 by the American Genre Film Archive and Something Weird Video. The Zodiac Killer was the first film restored by the American Genre Film Archive. Special features on the Blu-ray include a commentary track and an interview with director Tom Hanson and actor Manny Nedwick.

References

External links

 

1971 films
1971 horror films
1971 independent films
1970s thriller films
American independent films
American thriller films
American docudrama films
1970s English-language films
Films set in the San Francisco Bay Area
Films shot in San Francisco
1970s serial killer films
Crime films based on actual events
Cultural depictions of the Zodiac Killer
1970s slasher films
1970s American films